Kate Johnson, also known as Cat Marsters, is a British author who writes in the Paranormal and Speculative Romantic Novel genres. She is the author of the award-winning novel Max Seventeen.

Biography
Johnson is a British-born writer of paranormal novels, novellas and short stories especially in the romance area. She is the author of the Romantic Novel of the Year award-winning novel Max Seventeen. Her award-winning novel is self-published which made it the first time an indie publication won an award from the Romantic Novelists' Association. Her novel was also notable for having a bisexual main character. Johnson has also won the Wisconsin Romance Writers's Silver Quill and Passionate Ink's Passionate Plume award. Her debut novel was shortlisted for the Contemporary Romantic Novel Category Award in 2012. She is also published by Choc Lit. She lives in Essex.

Awards
 2018 – Shortlisted Paranormal or Speculative Romantic Novel of the Year Award
 2017 – Winner Paranormal or Speculative Romantic Novel of the Year Award
 2012 – Shortlisted Contemporary Romantic Novel of the Year Award
 2011 – Epic Award (as Cat Marsters)

Bibliography 
 Not Your Knight in Shining Armour: a Royal Wedding Romance
Not Your Royal Christmas, a royal romance novella
 Not Your Prince Charming: a Royal Wedding Romance
 Not Your Cinderella: a Royal Wedding Romance 
 I, Spy? (Sophie Green Mystery, #1) 
 "A" is for Apple (Sophie Green Mystery, #3) 
 Ugley Business (Sophie Green Mystery, #2) 
 Still Waters (Sophie Green Mystery, #4) 
 Run Rabbit Run (Sophie Green Mystery, #5) 
 The Twelve Lies of Christmas (Sophie Green Mystery, #0.5) 
 The UnTied Kingdom
 Impossible Things 
 Max Seventeen
 Max Seventeen: Firebrand
Little Haunting by the Sea

References

Further reading 

21st-century British novelists
British fantasy writers
British women novelists
Living people
Women science fiction and fantasy writers
21st-century British women writers
British romantic fiction writers
Women romantic fiction writers
People from Essex
People educated at Newport Free Grammar School
Year of birth missing (living people)